Shiju Sam Mannil (born 3 January 1978) is an Indian-born international cricket umpire based in the United Arab Emirates. In both 2018 and 2019 he was named as best umpire at the Shyam Bhatia Awards in Dubai. 

He stood in his first Twenty20 International (T20I) match between the United Arab Emirates and Nepal on 1 February 2019. He stood in his first One Day International (ODI) match between the United Arab Emirates and the United States in the 2019 United Arab Emirates Tri-Nation Series on 8 December 2019.

See also
 List of One Day International cricket umpires
 List of Twenty20 International cricket umpires

References

External links
 

1978 births
Living people
Emirati One Day International cricket umpires
Emirati Twenty20 International cricket umpires
People from Pandalam
Indian emigrants to the United Arab Emirates
Indian expatriate sportspeople in the United Arab Emirates